Paul du Plessis is a legal historian with a focus on law and society within the Roman Empire. He is the Professor of Roman Law at the University of Edinburgh and Director of The Centre for Legal History.

Du Plessis is a Fellow of the Royal Historical Society, co-author of The Edinburgh Legal History Blog and an editor for the monograph series Oxford Studies in Roman Society and Law.

Selected publications

References

External links 
Justinian's Legal Code (extended podcast version), In Our Time, du Plessis on the panel with Simon Corcoran and Caroline Humfress, 2016.
 Paul du Plessis' Twitter stream

Living people
Legal historians
Fellows of the Royal Historical Society
Academics of the University of Edinburgh
Year of birth missing (living people)